This article lists the Nationalist Party of Northern Ireland's election results in UK parliamentary elections.

Summary of general election performance

Election results

1922 general election

1923 general election

1929 general election

1931 general election

By-elections, 1931–35

1935 general election

1945 general election

1950 general election

1951 general election

1966 general election

References

F. W. S. Craig, Chronology of British Parliamentary By-elections 1833–1987

Nationalist Party (Northern Ireland)
Election results by party in the United Kingdom